Belgun Peak is the ice-covered peak with precipitous, partly ice-free west slopes, rising to 1205 m in the northwest extremity of Trakiya Heights on Trinity Peninsula in Graham Land, Antarctica.  It is situated on the east side of Zlidol Gate, surmounting the head of Russell West Glacier to the north, and the upper course of Victory Glacier to the south.

The peak is named after the settlement of Belgun in Northeastern Bulgaria.

Location
German-British mapping in 1996.

Maps
 Trinity Peninsula. Scale 1:250000 topographic map No. 5697. Institut für Angewandte Geodäsie and British Antarctic Survey, 1996.
 Antarctic Digital Database (ADD). Scale 1:250000 topographic map of Antarctica. Scientific Committee on Antarctic Research (SCAR), 1993–2016.

References
 Belgun Peak. SCAR Composite Antarctic Gazetteer
 Bulgarian Antarctic Gazetteer. Antarctic Place-names Commission. (details in Bulgarian, basic data in English)

External links
 Belgun Peak. Copernix satellite image

Mountains of Trinity Peninsula
Bulgaria and the Antarctic